Sakai River may refer to various rivers in Japan:

Rivers
Sakai River (Gifu)
Sakai River (Hokkaidō)
Sakai River (Tokyo, Kanagawa)